Aranuka Airport  is an airport, located approximately one kilometre north of the centre of Buariki village on the island of Buariki, Aranuka, Kiribati.

The airport is served twice a week by Air Kiribati from Kuria Airport on Kuria. From there, the aircraft continues twenty minutes after having landed to Bonriki International Airport, Tarawa.

Airlines and destinations

Notes

Airports in Kiribati
Aranuka